Aleksandra Kovačević was crowned Miss Earth Bosnia & Herzegovina 2011. She competed at Miss Earth finals held on 3 December 2011 at the University of the Philippines Theater in Diliman, Quezon City, Philippines and placed in Top 8.

References

Bosnia and Herzegovina female models
Living people
Year of birth missing (living people)
Serbian female models
Miss Earth 2011 contestants
Serbs of Bosnia and Herzegovina
Serb models